is a Japanese manga series written and illustrated by Hiroshi Gamo. It ran in Shueisha's shōnen manga magazine Weekly Shōnen Jump. Running between August 1993 and July 1997, The series is focused on the adventures of a bizarre superhero and his fights against various aliens and other enemies threatening the planet Earth.

A fifty-episode anime television series adaptation by Pierrot was broadcast on TV Tokyo between April 1994 and March 1995. Two video games Game Boy and Super Famicom consoles have been released and the titular character Luckyman is featured in Jump crossover video games Jump Ultimate Stars and J-Stars Victory VS.

Plot
Yōichi Tsuitenai is the unluckiest boy in his hometown. One day, his luck truly ran out when he was crushed by an alien spaceship, killing him. But in this time of need, he was discovered by Lucky Man, a cosmic superhero, who gives him the superpower of being extremely lucky. Now Yōichi, as Luckyman, must defend the Earth from aliens invading to conquer it, with the help of his sidekick, Doryokuman, their friend Superstarman, and three others, Shoriman, Yujoman, and Tensaiman.

Characters

Best 16 Super Heroes
The , is an elite team of 16 special heroes assembled by the chairman of the Hero Committee, an organization for super heroes, located on a hero-populated planet called the Hero Star. The team is formed up of the main team of six heroes selected by the Chairman as elites to fight aliens on earth, and 10 contestants from the 1053rd Hero Tournament that all won. "Nai-nai" is an onomatopoeia for the sound created when the 16 heroes all fire their beams at something.
Luckyman/Yōichi Tsuitenai

/ is the luckiest person in the entire universe. Although he is a super hero, he doesn't actually have any superstrength or superspeed, but instead relies on luck alone to win his fights. All of his attacks are slow, but they end up doing a lot of damage because something lucky always happens. Luckyman needs the presence of a shining star, the Lucky Star, in order for his luck to happen, in other words when it is a cloudy day or when the Lucky Star's presence doesn't reach him, he gets terrible luck and ends up on the verge of death. Lucky Man's appearance is a parody of Ultraman. He has the kanji "" emblazoned on his chest (Great luck, the top lucky fortune you can get at a Buddhist temple) and has a Chabashira (standing tea stalk in a teacup) on his forehead, another Japanese symbol of great luck. In order for Yōichi to transform into Lucky Man, he needs to swallow a "rakkyô" (a special pickled garlic clove infused with the power of good luck).  "Rakkyô" sounds like "Rakki", or "Lucky".
Doryokuman/Doryoku Sugita

/ is Luckyman's loyal sidekick and pupil, and always praises Luckyman's work, even though it's because of his luck.  He refers to Lucky Man as "Shissho" (しっしよ), or "Master". He wears a pair of geta sandals made out of tofu, however because he concentrated over a thousand bricks of tofu, the sandals are extremely hard and heavy. Also since he wears the sandals everyday, his legs are very fast and strong. He has a red, tear-shaped container on his head which is actually an emergency blood supply, in case he loses a lot of blood. "Doryoku" means "effort".
It was later revealed that he has two big brothers, named Yūjōman and Shōriman. It was also later revealed that unlike Luckyman, who is an earthling, The Doryoku Sankyōdai are actually alien super heroes disguised as earthlings, who come from the Hero Planet, a planet full of floating cars and crystalline buildings entirely populated by alien super heroes, and home to the Hero Committee, and its elite team of heroes (later revealed to be called "The Best 16 Super Heroes").
In order for Doryoku to transform into Doryokuman, he needs to write "Doryoku" ("effort") on a piece of paper and stick it on his chest.
Superstarman/Tagaru Medachi

/ , like Luckyman, is an earthing super hero, that resembles a pop star. He doesn't have any powers whatsoever, however even though he can't do anything he still tries to upstage Luckyman and Doryokuman when they are fighting aliens. He was originally a human, but when Luckyman and Doryokuman became famous for fighting aliens, he wanted a piece of the fame too, so he got himself surgery and became Superstarman. He is always beaten to a bloody pulp by enemies and friends alike when he gets too annoying, although for some reason he always recovers, and tries to upstage everyone again. It is revealed later that when he received surgery to become Superstarman, his body's cell regeneration rate got an incredible boost, and instead of his cell dividing from 1 to 2 and 2 to 4 his cells divided at a rate of 1 to 64. Because of this, he is pretty much semi-immortal, since he can heal before anyone can kill him.
In order for Tagaru to transform into Superstarman, he needs to wear a special bow tie that flips his eyes sideways, called a "Medachi Tie". "Medachi" literally means "vertical eye", although the term "Medachitai" literally means "I want fame".
Shōriman/Shōri Isono

/  is the older brother of both Doryokuman and Yūjōman, making him the oldest of the Doryoku Sankyōdai. He has never lost at anything, be it a fighting match or rock, paper, scissors. He promised himself that the day he loses will be the day he dies. When Doryokuman was a child, Shōriman framed Doryokuman for cheating in a match, but that was only because he promised their mom that he will never allow Doryokuman to become a super hero. He is a great chef when it comes to making pork chops, also he has a pocket with infinite spaces on his back. He has a fear of dumplings ever since Doryokuman tried to make them. The dumplings tasted horrible, however Shōriman didn't want to hurt his feelings, so he said he liked them. After that, Doryokuman just kept making them for every meal and Shōriman just kept eating them until finally one day he collapsed, he never touched another dumpling again. There is a tiny, silver man on the winning pedestal on his head named . "Shōri" means "victory".
In order for Shōri to transform into Shōriman, he needs to make the perfect pork chops and then stick it on his ears.
Yūjōman/Yūjō Atsui

/  is the second oldest of the Doryoku Sankyōdai. He is extremely friendly and is able to make friends where ever he goes. He usually doesn't fight himself and gets one of his friends to do all the work for him. When he is forced into a fight he is able to switch to Demon-mode and becomes as strong as Shōriman or Tensaiman. "Yūjō" means "friendship".
In order for Yūjō to transform into Yūjōman, he needs to call up his friends and make them dress him up as his super form.
Tensaiman/Tensai Umaretsuki

/, as his name suggests, is a born genius, and just as strong. He is also incredibly handsome. He has a hair cut similar to Cyborg 009, with a moon and star on the right side of his face. The moon and star have the power to completely obliterate anything in its path. He and Shōriman appear to be extreme rivals, on and off the battle field. He was also the leader of the Yubi Rangers, Oya Yubi Gunjo, and was a part of Hitman's team.  "Tensai" means "genius"
In order for Tensai to transform into Tensaiman, he needs to say something really, really smart and then a beam of light hits him and he transforms.
Hero Committee Chairman

The , as the name suggests, is the chairman of the Hero Committee (an association for super heroes), and also a certified super-hero (called "Ultra Hissatsu Special Man"). His eyes, nose and mouth respectively look like the katakana symbols エ, ラ, and イ.
Ippiki Okamiman
 is a hero who resembles a werewolf, hence his name, which means "lonely wolf". Before he became a hero he once got talked into jumping off a cliff by someone who was heavily implied to be Luckyman. After that incident he became distrustful towards everyone around him, until he met Yūjōman. He is the fastest hero in the Best 16 Super Heroes.
Otoko no Roman
 is a completely black-and-white hero that looks like a drawing on a post card. He is considered to be the weakest member of the Best 16 Super Heroes besides Superstarman.
Pashiri No.1

, formerly , is a hero who resembles an anthropomorphic rocket. He used to be Koyubi Green if the Yubi Rangers. He is now the only surviving Yubi Ranger along with Tensaiman, whom he calls "Aniki" (兄貴).  After he lost in a race against Ippiki Okamiman, nobody allowed him to call himself Speedman since he's not the fastest. He became Pashiri No.1 after that.
Sei Raman
 is, despite her name, the sole heroine of the Best 16 Super Heroes. She has hair that looks like the ocean. Her name is a combination of "sei" (saint) and "seira", the phonetic Japanese word for "sailor". She originally entered the hero tournament disguised as a male hero called "Sailor Man", because the tournament originally didn't allow women.
Shūseiman
 uses correction fluid to white out injuries on damaged heroes, and occasionally as a weapon. Because of this, he is considered to be the doctor of the Best 16 Super Heroes. "Shūsei" means "correction".
Niceman
 is considered to be the "nicest guy in the universe". Niceman has a habit of pointing to the "Nice" embossed on his suit.
Topman
 wears crowns all over his body. He is often considered Niceman's rival, and vice versa.
Spademan
 uses cards as his weapon. He was once pitted against Yūjōman in a fight but rather than hand to hand combat, Spademan challenged him to a game of Old Maid instead. By recruiting Luckyman into his team and using his luck, Yūjōman easily won against Spademan. However, Spademan argues that the match was just practice and that the next game is the real one. Yūjōman keeps winning the following matches and Spademan keeps using the same excuse to continue the match. The match soon turned into a game of endurance where both players couldn't eat or sleep. When Yūjōman gave him the correct card he needed to win, he fell unconscious. Yūjōman lost the card game, but won the fight. Spademan can sometimes predict the future using his cards, but it rarely works.
Kyūseishuman
 is a ninja-like hero that came from the other side of the universe. He has the ability to create black holes in which he uses to imprison opponents and as a portal for teleportations. "Kyūseishu" means "messiah".
Yonaoshiman/Yotchan

/ originally was an alien that came from a poverty filled planet, his family was killed 300 million years ago. Since then, he wears an armor in order to hide the scars that he got on his home planet. He was originally a righteous hero, and was friends with who is now known today as the Hero Committee Chairman, but betrayed the Hero Committee when his friend was chosen as the chairman and he not. After having a battle with Luckyman inside a rocket that hurdled towards the sun, he was killed. He was brought back to life as "Yonaoshiman SZG", and became friends with the Chairman again. "Yonaoshi" means "world reformation". Throughout half of the series, he wore a disguise and called himself "Yotchan", and claimed his place as the main super villain of the series. Yotchan has 2 different designs.

Other characters
Lucky-Wan

 is Luckyman's pet super-dog. Like his master, he doesn't have much fighting power either, and relies on his luck to win. He only appeared for 3 comics before being permanently replaced by Doryokuman as Luckyman's sidekick.
Hishoka
 is the Hero Committee Chairman's secretary. She has a huge crush on Tensaiman.
Sanbonbashiraman

 is the father of the Doryoku Sankyōdai. He looks like a combination between the three.
Slimeman
 is a hero made of green slime that, like all the other members of Yotchan's team, are actually villains. He is also Kusuri Yubi Yellow of the Yubi Rangers.
Powerman
 is a very big and strong villain who plays it rough. He is also Naka Yubi Red of the Yubi Rangers.
Kōtetsuman
 is a rather small, cylindrical villain made out of steel, who can dig very deep for minerals. He is also Hitosashi Yubi Blue of the Yubi Rangers.
Miyo Kireida

, also called , is a beautiful little girl from the school Yoichi goes to. Because Yoichi is unlucky, Mitchan absolutely hates him, but loves him when he is Luckyman.
Desuyo Busaiku

 is another girl from Yoichi's school, who is rather big and ugly in appearance, in sharp contrast to Mitchan. Also unlike Mitchan, Desuyo is absolutely in love with Yoichi. This is another sign of Yoichi's bad luck.
Ikuzou Mini

  is a greengrocer he supports lucky man with Umatarou and Gakudai.
Umatarou Yaji

 is owner of a ramen shop.
Gakudai Ken

 is a salaryman.
Kuro Tsuitenai 
He is father Yoichi he buys something which give luck to lucky. He is always wearing some luck clothes.
Masami Tsuitenai 
She is mother and has similar habits like her husband.
Hitoshi Busaiku
He is father of Desuyo.
Ayako Busaiku
She is mother of Desuyo.
Daisuke Hitoshi
Teacher of Yoichi's School.

Otete Sentai Yubi Ranger
 are the five villains in Yotchan's team also fight in cylindrical metal suits, each of a different color, and act as fingers for a giant hand. "Yubi" means "finger". Eventually, these characters all die, except for Tensaiman, Speedman, and Yotchan (Yonaoshiman).
Koyubi Green
, Speedman/Pashiri No. 1. He has a green suit and acts as the pinky finger.
Kusuri Yubi Yellow
, Slimeman. He has a yellow suit and acts as the ring finger.
Hitosashi Yubi Blue
, Kotetsuman. He has a blue suit and acts as the middle finger.
Naka Yubi Red
, Powerman. He has a red suit and acts as the index finger.
Oya Yubi Gunjō
, Tensaiman. He is the leader of the Yubi Rangers. He wears an ultramarine suit and acts as the thumb.

Episode list

Media

Manga
[[File:Weekly Shonen Jump issue 35.jpg|thumb|right|150px|Tottemo! Luckyman'''s first appearance in Weekly Shōnen Jump issue 35 in 1993.]]Tottemo! Luckyman is written and illustrated by Hiroshi Gamo. A pilot chapter was published in the 1993 17th issue of Shueisha's Weekly Shōnen Jump published on April 12, 1993. The regular serialization started in the 35th issue of the magazine on August 16, 1993, and it finished in the 30th issue of July 7, 1997. Shueisha compiled the individual chapters into sixteen tankōbon volumes published between February 9, 1994 and October 8, 1997. On June 29, 2012, Shueisha published eight volumes of the series in a digital format.

Anime
A fifty-episode anime television series adaptation produced by Pierrot was broadcast on TV Tokyo. The series aired from April 6, 1994 to March 23, 1995.

Video games
A video game entitled  for Game Boy was developed by Bandai and released on September 22, 1994. Another video game entitled  for Super Famicom was also developed by Bandai and released on June 30, 1995.

Luckyman is a playable character in two Jump crossover fighting games, Jump Ultimate Stars for Nintendo DS, released on November 23, 2006, and J-Stars Victory VS for the PlayStation 3, PlayStation 4 and PlayStation Vita, released March 19, 2014 in Japan, June 26, 2015 in Europe and June 30, 2015 in North America. This marks the first release of Tottemo! Luckyman material outside Japan. The English title of the manga is officially given in the game as Such a Luckyman!''.

References

External links
Official Tottemo! Luckyman website at Pierrot 

1993 manga
1994 anime television series debuts
1994 Japanese television series debuts
1994 video games
1995 Japanese television series endings
1995 video games
Action anime and manga
Bandai games
Comedy anime and manga
Game Boy games
Game Boy-only games
Japan-exclusive video games
Shōnen manga
Shueisha franchises
Shueisha manga
Super Nintendo Entertainment System games
Super Nintendo Entertainment System-only games
Pierrot (company)
TV Tokyo original programming
Video games developed in Japan